The GAA–GPA All-Star Hurler of the Year is a hurling award presented to the player voted as best in the country by all the players from around Ireland. It began in 1995 and honours the achievements of a hurler of outstanding excellence.

Kilkenny players have won the award 10 out of 28 times, ahead of Limerick with four wins. Tipperary, Cork, Waterford and Clare have won it three times each.

The award's youngest winner was Tony Kelly, who won at the age of 19 in 2013. Henry Shefflin and Cian Lynch are the only players to have won the award more than once. The oldest winner is also Henry Shefflin, who was 33 when he won in 2012.

In 2011 the Gaelic Athletic Association and the Gaelic Players' Association announced that their respective annual player awards schemes were to merge under the sponsorship of Opel. The first merged awards were presented in 2011.

Hurler of the Year
Bold denotes a player still active at inter-county level.

Breakdown of winners

Winners by county

References

 
1995 establishments in Ireland
Awards established in 1995
GAA GPA All Stars Awards
Hurling awards
All